Peter Oliver Loew (born 1967) is a German historian, translator, and scholar, specializing in the History of Poland.

Biography 
Loew was born in Frankfurt am Main and studied Eastern European history, Slavistics and economics at the University of Nuremberg, University of Freiburg and the Free University of Berlin. In 2001, he graduated on the historical culture of Danzig (Gdańsk) between 1793 and 1997.

He is the scientific Vice-director of the Deutsches Polen-Institut (Darmstadt) and has been a lecturer at the University of Mainz (since 2006) and the University of Darmstadt (since 2009).

Loew specializes in the history of Polish-German relations, the History of Danzig, Silesia and Pomerelia.

Publications 
 (with Jarosław Ellwart:) Śladami Bismarcka po Pomorzu. Region, Gdynia 2001, . German edition: Auf Bismarcks Spuren in Hinterpommern. Ein historisch-touristischer Leitfaden. Region, Gdynia 2003, 
 Danzig und seine Vergangenheit, 1793 bis 1997. Die Geschichtskultur einer Stadt zwischen Deutschland und Polen. Fibre, Osnabrück 2003, 
 (publ.:) Polen denkt Europa. Politische Texte aus zwei Jahrhunderten. Suhrkamp, Frankfurt am Main 2004, 
 Gdańsk literacki (1793–1945). Mestwin, Gdańsk 2005.
 Gdańsk. Między mitami. Borussia, Olsztyn 2006.
 Literarischer Reiseführer Danzig. Acht Stadtspaziergänge. Deutsches Kulturforum Östliches Europa, Potsdam 2009, 
 Das literarische Danzig 1793 bis 1945. Bausteine für eine lokale Kulturgeschichte. Peter Lang, Frankfurt am Main u.a. 2009, 
 [https://books.google.com/books?id=9ifeo6zdSMcC Danzig. Biographie einer Stadt]'' C.H. Beck, München 2011,

References 

1967 births
Living people
Writers from Frankfurt
21st-century German historians
Historians of Poland
Academic staff of Johannes Gutenberg University Mainz
German male non-fiction writers
Academic staff of Technische Universität Darmstadt
Free University of Berlin alumni